Institute Park is a public park in Worcester, Massachusetts. Founded on donated land in 1887, it is located next to the campus of Worcester Polytechnic Institute.

References 

Parks in Worcester, Massachusetts
Worcester Polytechnic Institute